The 2010 Connacht Senior Football Championship was that year's installment of the annual Connacht Senior Football Championship held under the auspices of the Connacht GAA. It was won by Roscommon who defeated Sligo in the final. This was Roscommon's first Connacht senior title since 2001. They overcame London and Leitrim to get to the final. Donie Shine dominated the scoring in the final.

Sligo's progress to the final was considered a surprise. They overcame the province's traditional big two - Mayo in the quarter-final, then Galway in the semi-final with the aid of a replay - only for Roscommon to defeat them by a single point.

The winning Roscommon team received the J. J. Nestor Cup, and automatically advanced to the quarter-final stage of the 2010 All-Ireland Senior Football Championship. Sligo entered the All-Ireland Qualifiers but soon exited.

Bracket

Quarter-finals

Semi-finals

Final

References

External links
Connacht GAA website

2C
Connacht Senior Football Championship